Michel Meda (born 24 December 2000) is a Cameroonian football defender who currently plays for Bourges Foot 18 B.

Club career

FK Pohronie
Meda joined Pohronie early September 2019. He made his professional Fortuna Liga debut for Pohronie against Senica on 28 September 2019, in an away fixture at OMS Arena. Meda had replaced Ján Dzúrik in the 87th minute of the match, shortly after Samson Akinyoola had scored the match's only goal, guaranteeing a narrow win for the home side.

Meda had helped the club retain the top division allegiance for the next season but was released from the club ahead of it.

References

External links
 
 
 Futbalnet profile 
 Eurofotbal profile

2000 births
Living people
Footballers from Nantes
Cameroonian footballers
Cameroonian expatriate footballers
Association football defenders
FK Pohronie players
Bourges Foot 18 players
Slovak Super Liga players
Expatriate footballers in Slovakia
Cameroonian expatriate sportspeople in Slovakia
Expatriate footballers in France
Cameroonian expatriate sportspeople in France